Leanne Clency Lyons (born July 17, 1973), better known by her stage name Lelee, is an American singer and television personality. Lyons is the founding member of the American vocal trio Sisters with Voices (SWV).

Early life 
Born Leanne Clencey Lyons in The Bronx, New York, Lyons' father left the family when she was ten years old, leaving her and her five siblings to be raised by her mother. By age fifteen, Lyons had left her mother's house and began living on her own. During her sophomore year at age sixteen, Lyons dropped out of Walton High School to support herself and her newborn daughter. Lyons was a mother of two by age seventeen, a daughter, Margaret Lyons  (born September 12, 1988) followed by a son Khiry Lyons (born January 21, 1991).

Career

Sisters with Voices (SWV) 
Lyons joined with her neighborhood friend Cheryl Gamble to create a singing group after being inspired by watching the TV competition show Star Search.  Shortly after, Gamble introduced Lyons to her friend Brooklyn native Tamara Johnson-George; and the group was formed. As SWV, they enjoyed a large amount of commercial success. Selling more than fifteen million albums worldwide, SWV became one of the most successful girl groups of all time and the 5th best selling girl group in R&B music.

Later life 
Lelee Lyons is the founding member of the multi-platinum trio Sisters with Voices (SWV) and CEO of LyonsGirl Entertainment, LLC. SWV disbanded in 1997. In a 2014 interview with WE tv, Lyons commented on how the break-up of the group left her feeling: "Depressed and all over the place. I didn't know who I was. I had no drive, no light".

By 2001, she had received her G.E.D and was working a job at an accounting firm when she was contacted by Coko's (Cheryl Gamble) manager about a performance in Japan. Lelee told this story on an episode of TV One's Unsung.

On January 30, 2014, she welcomed a granddaughter, through her son, named BraeLynn.

In 2019, Lelee began working on her autobiography I Regret the Day I Lost My Virginity: You Are Not Your Past. In the book, Lyons tackles tough, personal subjects that would make most people uncomfortable. The book was released in July 2019.

In June 2020, Lelee joined the season four cast of WEtv's hit show Growing Up Hip Hop: Atlanta, along with her children Margaret and Khiry. The fourth season premiered on January 7, 2021. She is also a fashion designer of an apparel line called "Cutee in a Hoodie", for women who love the comfort of a hoodie.

References

External links 
 

American contemporary R&B singers
Living people
People from New York (state)
1973 births
20th-century African-American women singers